The 2013–14 Quaid-e-Azam Trophy was one of two first-class domestic cricket competitions that were held in Pakistan during the 2013–14 season. It was the 56th edition of the Quaid-e-Azam Trophy, and was contested by fourteen teams representing regional cricket associations. It ran concurrently with the President's Trophy, which was contested by ten departmental teams.

Rawalpindi won the Quaid-e-Azam Trophy for the first time defeating Islamabad in the final.

Format
The format of the Quaid-e-Azam Trophy remained unchanged from the previous season, with the fourteen regional teams divided into two groups. After a series of round-robin matches, the top four teams from each group proceeded to the Super-Eight stage of the competition, with the remaining six teams entering the "bottom six stage". In both final stages, the teams were split into two groups for a further set of round-robin matches, after which the final was contested by the top team from each Super-Eight group.

Unlike the previous season, no departmental players were available and as a result the standing of the Quaid-e-Azam Trophy was diminished, with the President's Trophy being considered the "premier first-class tournament" in 2013–14.

Standings and points
Positions in the tables were determined by total points, most matches won, fewest matches lost, followed by adjusted net run rate (matches with no result, i.e. those where both teams did not complete their first innings, were disregarded); matches finishing in a draw were decided on first innings scores, with points awarded as follows:
Win having led on first innings = 9 points
Win having tied or trailed on first innings = 6 points
Tie having led on first innings = 5 points
Draw having led on first innings = 3 points
Draw having tied on first innings, or tie having trailed on first innings = 2 points
Loss, draw having trailed or with no result on first innings, or abandoned without a ball bowled = 0 points

Team locations

Group stage

Tables

Bottom six stage

Tables

Super-Eight stage

Tables

Final

Notes

References

Domestic cricket competitions in 2013–14
2013 in Pakistani cricket
2014 in Pakistani cricket
2013–14 Quaid-e-Azam Trophy
Pakistani cricket seasons from 2000–01